Retinoic acid early transcript 1E (RAET1E) is a cell surface glycoprotein encoded by RAET1E gene located on the chromosome 6. RAET1E is related to MHC class I molecules, but its gene maps outside the MHC locus. RAET1E is composed of external α1α2 domain, transmembrane segment and C-terminal cytoplasmic tail. RAET1E functions as a stress-induced ligand for NKG2D receptor.

References

Further reading